is an old province in the area of Nagano Prefecture.

It was located in the Tōsandō region of central Honshu. According to the old history book Shoku Nihongi, it was established on June 26 of 721 and abolished on March 3 of 731 (old Japanese calendar's date). Neither the location of the capital nor the exact border with Shinano is known.

Historical districts
 Ina District (伊那郡): split to become Kamiina and Shimoina Districts
 Suwa District (諏訪郡)

Gallery

See also
Lake Suwa
Suwa taisha
Suwa, Nagano

Notes

References
 Nussbaum, Louis-Frédéric and Käthe Roth. (2005).  Japan encyclopedia. Cambridge: Harvard University Press. ;  OCLC 58053128

Other websites

  Murdoch's map of provinces, 1903

731 disestablishments
Former provinces of Japan
States and territories established in the 720s
721 establishments